Zirrah (also Romanized as Zīrrāh, Zīrāh, and Zīr Rāh; also known as Sīr-e Rāh, Sīr Rāh, Zira, and Zīreh) is a village in Zirrah Rural District, Sadabad District, Dashtestan County, Bushehr Province, Iran. At the 2006 census, its population was 136, in 31 families.

References 

Populated places in Dashtestan County